The Quezzi elevator is a public inclined elevator with variable slope in the Quezzi quarter of Genoa, Italy. The elevator opened in May 2015 and connects the lower terminus at Via Pinetti to the terminus at Via Fontanarossa, with an intermediate stop at Portazza.

The plant is one of the many public people movers in the city, including several elevators and funiculars, the older and best known of which are the Zecca–Righi funicular, the Sant'Anna funicular and the Principe–Granarolo rack railway. The latter is erroneously described as a funicular in popular jargon.

From 1 December 2021 it has been free to use courtesy of the Municipality of Genoa and AMT.

Operation 
The lower section has a gradient of 44%, transitioning to a gradient of 30% in the upper section. The single car is designed to tilt, in order to maintain the floor leveled, despite the change in gradient.

The line has the following parameters:

References 

Railway lines in Liguria
Transport in Genoa
Inclined elevators